KSOI may refer to:

 Kaposi's sarcoma
 KSOI (FM), a radio station (91.9 FM) licensed to serve Murray, Iowa, United States